"Have a Cheeky Christmas" is a song by Romanian pop duo the Cheeky Girls. It was released as a single on 8 December 2003 in the United Kingdom. The single peaked at number 10 on the UK Singles Chart and number 32 on the Irish Singles Chart.

Track listings
UK CD1
 "Have a Cheeky Christmas" (radio edit)
 "Cheeky Song (Touch My Bum)" (Christmas mix)
 "Have a Cheeky Christmas" (karaoke mix)
 "Have a Cheeky Christmas" (video)

UK CD2
 "Have a Cheeky Christmas" (radio edit)
 "Salsa in the Disco"

Charts

Weekly charts

Year-end charts

References

The Cheeky Girls songs
2003 singles
2003 songs
Christmas songs
Multiply Records singles